In the field of physical chemistry, a nonthermal surface reaction refers to an elementary reaction between a thermally accommodated adsorbed surface species and a reactant which has not yet thermally accommodated to the surface.
The two main mechanisms classified as nonthermal are the Eley-Rideal and hot atom mediated mechanisms.

Surface science